Flagg Center is an unincorporated community in the southeastern portion of Ogle County, Illinois, United States in Flagg Township. It may be found at the crossroads of Flagg and Center Roads, hence the name Flagg Center.

References

External links 
 NACo

Unincorporated communities in Ogle County, Illinois
Unincorporated communities in Illinois